Antonio Mihaylov (born on 9 June 1991) is a Bulgarian footballer currently playing for AS Calcio Kreuzlingen as an attacking midfielder.

Career
7-years old Mihaylov arrived in Italy together with his parents. He started playing football at Lombardia Uno. In 2007 he joined Milan. During his time in the club's youth system, he was a member of the under-18 and under-20 side who triumphed in the Coppa Italia Primavera in 2010, 25 years after the team's last success in the competition.

Club statistics
As of 22 July 2010

References

Bulgarian footballers
1991 births
Living people
OFC Sliven 2000 players
First Professional Football League (Bulgaria) players

Association football forwards
FC Kreuzlingen players